The Anglican Church of St Nicholas in Bratton Seymour, Somerset, England, was built in the 13th century. It is a Grade II* listed building.

History

The church was built in the 13th century. It was originally dedicated to St. Giles, and has also been known as Holy Trinity Church.

Due to the condition of some of the stonework and ceilings the building has been laced o the Heritage at Risk Register.

The parish is part of the Camelot Parishes benefice within the Diocese of Bath and Wells.

Architecture

The stone building has Doulting and hamstone dressings and slate roofs. It consists of a three-bay nave and two-bay chancel with a small vestry and south porch. The nave walls incorporate remnants of 12th-century carvings. The west tower is supported by angled buttresses and contains bells from the 14th and 15th centuries.

The interior fittings are mostly from the 19th century, but it does contain a circular Norman font.

See also  
 List of ecclesiastical parishes in the Diocese of Bath and Wells

References

Grade II* listed buildings in South Somerset
Grade II* listed churches in Somerset
Structures on the Heritage at Risk register in Somerset
Church of England church buildings in South Somerset